Jean Debucourt (19 January 1894 – 22 March 1958) was a French stage and film actor. He appeared in more than 100 films between 1920 and 1958.

Selected filmography

 The Little Thing (1923)
 Jean Chouan (1926)
 Madame Récamier (1928)
 The Fall of the House of Usher (1928)
 Saint Joan the Maid (1929)
 The Agony of the Eagles (1933)
 Prince Jean (1934)
 Koenigsmark (1935)
 Mayerling (1936)
 Woman of Malacca (1937)
 Beethoven's Great Love (1937)
 The Drunkard (1937)
 Sarajevo (1940)
 Thunder Over Paris (1940)
 The Trump Card (1942)
 Love Story (1943)
 Marie-Martine (1943)
 Malaria (1943)
 The Woman Who Dared (1944)
 Her Final Role (1946)
 The Idiot (1946)
 Roger la Honte (1946)
 Rendezvous in Paris (1947)
 Devil in the Flesh (1947)
 The Woman in Red (1947)
 The Fugitive (1947)
 Not Guilty (1947)
 The Eagle with Two Heads (1948)
 The Lame Devil (1948)
 Last Love (1949)
 The Secret of Mayerling (1949)
 White Paws (1949)
 Justice Is Done (1950)
 Rome Express (1950)
 Paris Vice Squad (1951)
 La Poison (1951)
 The Nude Dancer (1952)
 Jocelyn (1952)
 Leathernose (1952)
 The Long Teeth (1952)
 The Lovers of Marianne (1953)
 The Porter from Maxim's (1953)
 The Secret of Helene Marimon (1954)
 Mam'zelle Nitouche (1954)
 Huis clos (1954)
 Men in White (1955)
 The Wages of Sin (1956)
 The Crucible (1957)

References

External links

1894 births
1958 deaths
French male film actors
French male silent film actors
Deaths from leukemia
Deaths from cancer in France
Male actors from Paris
20th-century French male actors
Sociétaires of the Comédie-Française